Tzu or TZU may refer to the following:

TZU, an Australian hip-hop group
Tzu (poetry), a format of Chinese poetry
Chinese characters (han-tzu)
Courtesy name (tzu), a Chinese given name used later in life
Tzu (surname), the surname of the kings of Shang China